Rise is the debut album by Northern Ireland rock band The Answer. It has sold in excess of 30,000 copies in the UK & Europe and 10,000 on day one in Japan.

The album was recorded at Olympic Studio 1 at the Monnow Valley Studio in Wales and the Albert Studio in London during the fall of 2005. Produced by Andy Bradfield and Avril MacKintosh, the Albert Productions team (with back room production from George Young) and Neal Calderwood from the band's hometown.

Tracks released from the album were "Never Too Late", "Into The Gutter", "Under The Sky", "Come Follow Me" and "Be What You Want".

Their website initially stated that Rise should have been released in the United States by December 2010. However, since signing with Napalm Records, they have announced that re-releases of The Answer's back catalogue will be released in the United States and other key territories in the near future. It was eventually released in the US in late 2013.

Track listings

Personnel
Cormac Neeson - Lead vocals
Paul Mahon - Guitar
Micky Waters - Bass
James Heatley - Drums

Studio Personnel 
Recorded at: Olympic Studios, Monnow Valley, Albert's

Engineered by: Avril Mackintosh, Andy Bradfield

Mixed by: Andy Bradfield

Special edition
A special edition version of the album was released on 17 June 2007 under the name "Rise: Special Edition". It contained two discs, with the first being the original "Rise" track listing, and the second being a collection of B-Sides, live recordings, as well as some acoustic sessions. It was given four out of five stars by TheMusicZine.

Special edition disc 2 track listing

The live versions of "Come Follow Me", "Sometimes Your Love" and "Be What You Want/Moment Jam" are also available on the Everyday Demons special edition CDs.

Singles

Under the Sky
"Under the Sky" is a song by The Answer which was featured on their album Rise, and was released as a download-only single in 2006.

Track listing
 "Under the Sky"
 "I Won't Let You Down"
 "Doctor" (live session)
 "Under the Sky" (video)

Come Follow Me
"Come Follow Me" is a song by The Answer which was featured on their album Rise, and was released as a download-only single in 2006.

Track listing
 "Come Follow Me"
 "Preachin'" (acoustic)
 "So Cold"

Be What You Want
"Be What You Want" is a song by The Answer. It was featured on their album Rise, and was released as a download-only single in 2007.

Track listing
 "Be What You Want"
 "Sweet Emotion"
 "Into the Gutter" (acoustic)
 "No Questions Asked" (live radio version)

References

2006 debut albums
The Answer (band) albums
Albert Productions albums